Tare, Rwanda is a town and sector and capital of Rulindo district of Northern Province, Rwanda.

It is the birthplace of Grégoire Kayibanda, the first president of Rwanda.

External links
Maplandia

Populated places in Rwanda